Clair (2016 population: 781) is a former Canadian village in Madawaska County, New Brunswick.

History

Situated on the Saint John River opposite Fort Kent, Maine. The name Clair finds its roots in the community named for County Clare in Ireland. The name of the village is the result of the railroad station being located near the General store of James T. Clair.  The station was called Clair's and was a regular stop of the Temiscouata Railway on its way up to the Connors station.  Over time, the name stuck and was shortened to the family name of Clair.  The original name of the location was actually "La Petite Décharge" named after the discharge of the small "ruisseau des Lang" into the Saint John River.

Forestry is the basis of the local economy.

The Clair – Fort Kent Bridge crosses the International Boundary to link both communities.

Demographics

Population trend

Mother tongue language (2016)

Attractions
The local Roman Catholic church houses noted religious artwork, including stained-glass windows from the workshop of Belgian artist José Gaterrath and the Stations of the Cross by the famous Spanish ceramist Jordi Bonet.

Notable people

See also
List of communities in New Brunswick

References

External links
Centre d'Apprentissage du Haut Madawaska is the primary public school in Clair (k - 8)

Communities in Madawaska County, New Brunswick
Former villages in New Brunswick
New Brunswick populated places on the Saint John River (Bay of Fundy)